Gavin Forsyth (born 4 July 1969 in Manchester) is a British former alpine skier who competed in the 1992 Winter Olympics. He is the owner/operator of Clear Dental in British Columbia, Canada.

References

1969 births
Living people
Sportspeople from Manchester
English male alpine skiers
Olympic alpine skiers of Great Britain
Alpine skiers at the 1992 Winter Olympics